Zealandia vieillardii, synonym Microsorum vieillardii, is a species of fern native to New Caledonia.

References

Polypodiaceae